Five Get into Trouble is a 1970 Danish-German film directed by Katrine Hedman based on Enid Blyton's 1949 novel Five Get into Trouble.

Cast 
 Lone Thielke: Georg (Georgina)
 Mads Rahbek: Julius
 Niels Kibenich: Richard
 Sanne Knudsen: Anne
 Ove Sprogøe: Uncle Quentin
 Astrid Villaume: Aunt Fanny
 Lily Broberg: Servant Johanna
 Kristian Paaschburg: Richard Kent
 Manfred Reddemann: Perton
 Werner Abrolat: Johnny
 Hubert Mittendorf: Max
 Frank Nossack: Rooky
 Jørn Walsøe Therkelsen: Weston
 Marie Brink: Aggie
 Børge Hilbert: Kaufmann
 Ruth Maisie: Lady at the shop
 Christian Hansen: Policeman
 Max Gårdsted: Police officer
 Ragnhild Jørgensen: Richard's mother
 Poul Rahbek: Richard's father
 Willy Flink: Man at petrol station

External links 
 
 

1970 films
1970s mystery films
German mystery films
Danish crime films
Danish children's films
German children's films
West German films
1970s Danish-language films
Films based on British novels
Films based on children's books
Adaptations of works by Enid Blyton
1970s German films